This is the list of current members of the Provincial Assembly of Balochistan elected following the 2018 provincial election.

Members

References

2018 Pakistani general election
Lists of current office-holders in Pakistan